Marianne Winkelstern (1910–1966) was a German dancer and actress. She retired and settled in Britain after marrying an Englishman.

Selected filmography
 The Carnival Prince (1928)
 The Circus Princess (1929)
 The White Devil (1930)
 Waltz of Love (1930)
 The Big Attraction  (1931)
 My Heart Longs for Love (1931)

References

Bibliography
 Hardt, Ursula. From Caligari to California: Erich Pommer's Life in the International Film Wars. Berghahn Books, 1996.

External links

1910 births
1966 deaths
German female dancers
German stage actresses
German film actresses
Military personnel from Berlin
German emigrants to the United Kingdom
Naturalised citizens of the United Kingdom